Charles Tung-Tai Lin (born April 25, 1950) is currently a professor at the Graduate Institute of Mass Communication at National Taiwan Normal University, NTNU (國立臺灣師範大學), where he served as vice president from August 2011 to July 2014.
His fields of interest include communication theories, research methodology, opinion survey, and social marketing.

Education

BA in Department of Adult and Continuing Education, Journalism Group, NTNU
MA in Department of Journalism, National Chengchi University
MA in Department of Mass Communication, Michigan State University, U.S.
Ph.D. in Department of Mass Communication, Ohio State University, U.S.

Governmental positions

2006/02-2008/08 Commissioner, National Communications Commission
2001/12-2004/12 Director, The 2nd Public Television Foundation Board 
2000-2004 President, Chinese Association for Public Opinion Research
1998/12-2001/12 Director, The 1st Public Television Foundation Board 
1998-2001 Commissioner, The 2nd Cable Radio and TV Commission 
1999-2000 Vice president, Chinese Association for Public Opinion Research 
1995-1998 Commissioner, The 1st Cable Radio and TV Commission 
1988-1999 Secretary general, Chinese Association for Public Opinion Research 
1994-1998 Vice chairman, The Institute of Education for Mass Communication of R. O. C.

Academic positions

2011/08-2014/07 Vice President, NTNU
2009/08-Now Dean, College of Social Sciences, NTNU
1997/08-2003/07 Director, The Graduate Institute of Mass Communication, NTNU
1993/08-1995/07 Chairman, Department of Adult and Continuing Education, NTNU
1985/8-1990/7 Chairman, Department of Mass Communication, Tamkang University

References

1950 births
Living people
Academic staff of the National Taiwan Normal University
National Taiwan Normal University alumni
National Chengchi University alumni
Michigan State University alumni
Ohio State University School of Communication alumni